Events from the year 1460 in France

Incumbents
 Monarch – Charles VII

Events
 4 April - The University of Nantes is founded
 Unknown - The Collège Sainte-Barbe is established in Paris

Births
 29 September - Louis II de la Trémoille, soldier (died 1525)

References

1460s in France